Martha Thorne is an American architectural academic, curator, editor, and author. She is the Executive Director of the Pritzker Architecture Prize and Dean in the architecture school at IE University in Madrid.  Formerly, she was a curator in architecture at the Art Institute of Chicago.

Biography
Martha Thorne was born on March 6, 1953, in the United States. Her focus is international contemporary architecture.

Thorne holds degrees from State University of New York at Buffalo (Bachelor of Arts, Urban Affairs) and University of Pennsylvania (Master's degree, City Planning). She continued her education at the London School of Economics.

Since 2005, she has served as the Executive Director of the Pritzker Architecture Prize. From 1996 until 2005, she was Associate Curator for the Department of Architecture at The Art Institute of Chicago.
Her duties at The Art Institute of Chicago included publication development, study participating, and collection curation. She also was a member of the Board of Trustees of the Graham Foundation for Advanced Studies in the Fine Arts and served on the International Archive of Women in Architecture's Board of Advisors.
She currently serves on an international jury for the award, ArcVision: Women and Architecture, a prize honouring outstanding women architects. She also lectures and assists with international architectural competitions.
Prior to her appointment as dean of IE University's Madrid and Segovia School of Architecture and Design in 2015, Thorne served as Associate Dean for External Relations at IE School of Architecture.

Style and work
Her main inspiration themes are the contemporary city and how architecture, design, and urbanism can contribute to sustainability and resilience; and how architecture and design education can evolve in both content and pedagogy to be more relevant for today’s challenges. From 1995 to 2005, she worked as curator in Department of Architecture at The Art Institute of Chicago. She has written numerous articles for books and journals on contemporary architecture and the city.

Selected works
1992, Visiones para Madrid: cinco ideas arquitectónicas, Zaha Hadid, Mikko Heikkinen & Markku Komonen, Hans Hollein, Alvaro Siza, Stanley Tigerman: [exposition], Centro Cultural Conde Duque, 16 noviembre-10 enero 1993
1994, Museos y arquitectura : nuevas perspectivas [Exposición del 10.05 al 12.06.1994 en la sala de exposiciones del Círculo de Bellas Artes, Madrid / comisaria Martha Thorne]
1999, The Pritzker Architecture Prize : the first twenty years (with Colin Amery; et al.)
2000, Rafael Moneo, Audrey Jones Beck Building, the Museum of Fine Arts, Houston (with Joe C Aker; Gary Zvonkovic; José Rafael Moneo)
2001, Modern trains and splendid stations: Architecture, design and rail travel for the twenty-first century
2002, David Adler, architect : the elements of style (with Richard Guy Wilson; Pauline C Metcalf)
2004, Unbuilt Chicago (with Art Institute of Chicago)
2006, Informe sobre el fomento de la arquitectura. Anexo (with Fundación Arquitectura Contemporánea)

References

1953 births
Living people
American curators
American women curators
American editors
University at Buffalo alumni
University of Pennsylvania School of Design alumni
Alumni of the London School of Economics
Architecture academics
American women architects
20th-century American architects
American women non-fiction writers
20th-century American non-fiction writers
21st-century American architects
21st-century American non-fiction writers
20th-century American women writers
21st-century American women writers
American women editors